Immunix is a discontinued commercial operating system that provided host-based application security solutions. The last release of Immunix's Linux distribution was version 7.3 on November 27, 2003. Immunix, Inc. was the creator of AppArmor, an application security system.

On May 10, 2005, Novell acquired Immunix, Inc., a long-time partner with Novell. AppArmor was one of Novell's primary interests, and as a result, it was adopted by the company and renamed Novell AppArmor powered by Immunix. In September 2007, Novell laid off the AppArmor team.

See also 
 Novell
 Security-focused operating system

References 

Discontinued Linux distributions
Free security software
Linux distributions